Jeff Greer (born March 8, 1964, in Brandenburg, Kentucky) is an American politician who served as a Democratic member of the Kentucky House of Representatives representing District 27 From January 2007 to January 2019.

Education
Greer earned his BA in business administration from Eastern Kentucky University.

Elections
2012 Greer and returning 2010 Republican challenger Dalton Jantzen were both unopposed for their May 22, 2012 primaries, setting up a rematch; Greer won the November 6, 2012 General election with 7,548 votes (51.0%) against Jantzen.
2006 To challenge District 27 incumbent Republican Representative Gerry Lynn, Greer was unopposed for the 2006 Democratic Primary and won the November 7, 2006 General election with 5,888 votes (53.4%) against Representative Lynn.
2008 Greer was unopposed for both the 2008 Democratic Primary and the November 4, 2008 General election, winning with 10,827 votes.
2010 Greer was unopposed for the May 18, 2010 Democratic Primary and won the November 2, 2010 General election with 6,219 votes (50.5%) against Republican nominee Dalton Jantzen.

References

External links
Official page  at the Kentucky General Assembly
Campaign site

Jeff Greer at Ballotpedia
Jeff Greer at the National Institute on Money in State Politics

1964 births
Living people
Eastern Kentucky University alumni
Democratic Party members of the Kentucky House of Representatives
People from Brandenburg, Kentucky
21st-century American politicians